Kevin Lenini Gonçalves Pereira de Pina (born 27 January 1997) is a Cape Verdean professional footballer who plays as a defensive midfielder for Russian club Krasnodar and the Cape Verde national team.

Club career
A youth product of the Cape Verdean team Tchadense, Pina made his professional debut with Oliveirense in a 3–2 LigaPro loss to Benfica B on 13 January 2018. He shortly after went on loan to Anadia and Sertanense, before transferring to Chaves in 2019.

On 8 September 2022, Pina signed a three-year contract with the Russian Premier League club Krasnodar.

International career
Pina was called up to represent the Cape Verde national team for 2022 FIFA World Cup qualification matches in September 2021. He debuted with Cape Verde in a 6–0 friendly win over Liechtenstein on 25 March 2022.

Career statistics

References

External links
 
 

1997 births
Sportspeople from Praia
Living people
Cape Verdean footballers
Cape Verde international footballers
Association football midfielders
U.D. Oliveirense players
Anadia F.C. players
Sertanense F.C. players
G.D. Chaves players
FC Krasnodar players
Campeonato de Portugal (league) players
Liga Portugal 2 players
Primeira Liga players
Russian Premier League players
Cape Verdean expatriate footballers
Expatriate footballers in Portugal
Cape Verdean expatriate sportspeople in Portugal
Expatriate footballers in Russia
Cape Verdean expatriate sportspeople in Russia